The Two Hearted River is a river in the eastern Upper Peninsula of the U.S. state of Michigan.  It is located entirely within McMillan Township in Luce County.

The river runs approximately  through forested wilderness, and drains into Lake Superior. The main branch flows generally northeast, approaching Lake Superior at a sharp angle.

The North Country Trail crosses near the mouth of the Two Hearted River along Lake Superior.

History
A Michigan Historic Marker commemorates the Two-Hearted Life-Saving Station built in 1876 at the river mouth.  It was a simple two-story building with a small lookout tower manned by six to eight volunteer surfmen who conducted rescues of the Satellite (1879) and the Phineas S. Marsh (1896).  The station, along with the rest of the United States Life-Saving Service, was integrated into the U.S. Coast Guard in 1915, decommissioned in the 1930s, and its structures were razed in 1944.

Popular culture
Bell's Brewery, a craft brewery based in Kalamazoo, Michigan, makes a highly rated (the best beer in the United States according to Zymurgy Magazine, the publication of the American Homebrewers Association) India Pale Ale named Two Hearted Ale, with a graphic that features the river.

The river is a popular destination for recreational fishing. As such, it was the title of a famous short story, "Big Two-Hearted River", by U.S. author Ernest Hemingway.  Hemingway used the name because of its appeal; however, the geography of the story indicates that Hemingway was really describing a different trout stream, the Fox River near Seney.  The story, set after World War I, was first published in 1925 as part of the collection In Our Time and republished in 1972 as part of The Nick Adams Stories.  Later the short stories Part I and II start out the 2000 collection Hemingway on Fishing edited by Nick Lyons.

See also
 List of lifesaving stations in Michigan
 Little Two Hearted River

References

External links
 U.S. Coast Guard Search & Rescue Index

Rivers of Michigan
Rivers of Luce County, Michigan
Life-Saving Service stations
Tributaries of Lake Superior